Homorthodes furfurata, the northern scurfy Quaker moth or scurfy Quaker moth, is a species of moth in the family Noctuidae (owlet moths).
It was described by Augustus Radcliffe Grote in 1874 and is found in forest habitats in North America. Its range extends across the continent, to south-eastern Canada, Massachusetts, New York, and Mississippi. In the west it ranges south to California, Arizona, New Mexico and Texas.

The wingspan is about 25 mm. Adults are red-brown to orange-brown with indistinct markings and a few small white spots. Adults are on wing in summer.

The larvae feed on various hardwood species, including maples Acer and Prunus species, as well as Oemleria cerasiformis.

The MONA or Hodges number for Homorthodes furfurata is 10532.

Subspecies
Homorthodes furfurata furfurata
Homorthodes furfurata lindseyi (Benjamin, 1922) New Jersey

References

Further reading
 Lafontaine, J. Donald & Schmidt, B. Christian  (2010). "Annotated check list of the Noctuoidea (Insecta, Lepidoptera) of North America north of Mexico". ZooKeys, vol. 40, 1-239.
 Arnett, Ross H. (2000). American Insects: A Handbook of the Insects of America North of Mexico. CRC Press.

External links
Butterflies and Moths of North America
NCBI Taxonomy Browser, Homorthodes furfurata

Noctuinae
Moths described in 1874